The name Fog Bowl has been given to games in which a thick fog covered the field, limiting visibility:

 50th Grey Cup, the 1962 Canadian Football League Championship Game won by the Winnipeg Blue Bombers over the Hamilton Tiger-Cats
 Fog Bowl (American football), a December 31, 1988, National Football League playoff game between the Philadelphia Eagles and the Chicago Bears
 The 1974 Sun Bowl, played December 28, 1974, between the Mississippi State Bulldogs and the North Carolina Tar Heels